Frank Evans (December 1, 1921 – August 3, 2012) was a professional baseball player in the Negro leagues.

He played for multiple Negro league teams in his career, which began in 1937. He played for the Memphis Red Sox, Kansas City Monarchs, Detroit Stars, Cleveland Buckeyes, Birmingham Black Barons and Philadelphia Stars. He manned multiple positions, including catcher, first base, outfield and occasionally pitcher.

In 1954, he played for the Port Arthur Sea Hawks and Borger Gassers of the Evangeline League and West Texas–New Mexico League, respectively, hitting .313 in 19 games.

He later served as a manager in the Negro Leagues and an instructor for multiple major league teams, coached for the Louisville Redbirds and served as a major league scout.

References

1921 births
2012 deaths
Birmingham Black Barons players
Cleveland Buckeyes players
Detroit Stars players
Kansas City Monarchs players
Memphis Red Sox players
Philadelphia Stars players
Minor league baseball players
People from Linden, Alabama
Baseball players from Alabama
20th-century African-American sportspeople
21st-century African-American people